Henrique Roberto Rafael (born 23 August 1993), better known as Henrique, is a Brazilian footballer who plays as a midfielder for Bulgarian club CSKA 1948.

Club career
Born in Santa Rita do Sapucaí, Minas Gerais, Henrique was an Atlético Mineiro youth graduate, also training with the main squad in 2012. In 2014, he was loaned to Ipatinga, and made his senior debut on 2 August 2014 by starting in a 2–3 Série D home loss against Globo.

On 4 September 2014, Henrique joined XV de Piracicaba on loan until the end of the year. On 30 December, despite struggling with injuries, he renewed his contract for a further six months.

On 30 April 2015 Henrique signed for Paraná on loan until December. On 8 May he made his professional debut, starting and scoring the game's only in a home success against Ceará for the Série B championship.

Henrique finished the campaign with five goals and six assists in 28 appearances, being included in Galo's first team squad in the following year after his loan expired.

CSKA Sofia
On 17 June 2017, Henrique joined Bulgarian club CSKA Sofia on a season-long loan deal. He made 22 league appearances during his spell with the club and signed for CSKA permanently on a two-year contract for an undisclosed fee on 7 June 2018.

Marítimo
In June 2021, Henrique signed a contract with Primeira Liga club Marítimo.

CSKA 1948
In June 2022  Henrique was heavily linked with returning to Bulgaria, but this time with CSKA 1948, managed by Lyuboslav Penev, with whom he worked in CSKA Sofia. On 29 June 2022 he officially signed a contract with the team.

Career statistics

Honours
CSKA Sofia
 Bulgarian Cup: 2020–21

References

External links

Living people
1993 births
Brazilian footballers
Association football midfielders
Campeonato Brasileiro Série B players
Campeonato Brasileiro Série D players
First Professional Football League (Bulgaria) players
Primeira Liga players
Clube Atlético Mineiro players
Ipatinga Futebol Clube players
Esporte Clube XV de Novembro (Piracicaba) players
Paraná Clube players
Esporte Clube Bahia players
Grêmio Novorizontino players
PFC CSKA Sofia players
C.S. Marítimo players
FC CSKA 1948 Sofia players
Brazilian expatriate footballers
Brazilian expatriate sportspeople in Bulgaria
Expatriate footballers in Bulgaria
Expatriate footballers in Portugal
Sportspeople from Minas Gerais